Jacob Forney Jr. House is a historic home located near Morganton, Burke County, North Carolina, United States.  It was built in 1825–1826, and is a two-story, four-bay, Federal-style brick house.  It sits on a stone foundation.

It was listed on the National Register of Historic Places in 1976.

References

Houses on the National Register of Historic Places in North Carolina
Federal architecture in North Carolina
Houses completed in 1826
Houses in Burke County, North Carolina
National Register of Historic Places in Burke County, North Carolina
1826 establishments in North Carolina